Djibouti is a country in the Horn of Africa.

Djibouti also may refer to:
Djibouti City, capital of the country
Djibouti (anthem), the national anthem of Djibouti
The Afar language is the official language of Djibouti 
Djibouti (novel) (2010), novel by Elmore Leonard

See also
Afar (disambiguation) 
Somali (disambiguation)